Ashraf Rifi (also spelled Achraf Rifi) (born 1 April 1954) was the general director of the Lebanese Internal Security Forces (ISF; the national police) from 2005 to 2013. He served as minister of justice from 15 February 2014 to 21 February 2016.

Early life and education
Rifi was born into a Sunni family in Tripoli, Lebanon on 1 April 1954. He attended Lebanese University, studying the sociology of crime. He studied police work abroad during assignments with police forces in Ottawa, Ontario, Canada; Maisons-Alfort, France; and Saudi Arabia.

Career and alliances
Rifi was promoted to major general in April 2005 when he was named to head the national police due to the resignation of former head, Ali Al Hajj. Rifi is one of the board members of the Prince Nayef University for Security Studies. Rifi has close ties to Saudi Arabia.

Rifi's term ended on 1 April 2013 and he retired due to mandatory age limit. Rifi's term was not extended by the Lebanese government, leading to resignation of premier Najib Mikati in March 2013. Hezbollah members of the Mikati cabinet did not endorse the extension of his term. Roger Salem, who had been deputy of Rifi since December 2012, succeeded Rifi as head of the ISF. Saad Hariri proposed Rifi as a new prime minister, but his proposal was not supported.

Rifi as a general director of internal Security Forces was very open to cooperate with civil society organizations. For example, he supported the partnership between ISF and YASA (youth association for social awareness) in many road safety interventions that contributed positively for road safety in Lebanon. He supported the efforts that led to the new Lebanese traffic law #243 that was enacted by the Lebanese parliament in 2012.

Rifi was appointed justice minister in the cabinet led by Tammam Salam on 15 February 2014. He resigned as justice minister on 21 February 2016, due to his disapproval of the influence of Hezbollah, the Lebanese Shiite political group, in the Lebanese government. Rifi quit by order of Saudi Arabia according to the assertions of Al Jazeera while they pulled a $3-billion deal to equip the Lebanese security forces and blamed Hezbollah's influence for preventing Lebanon from backing Saudi Arabia in the Gulf kingdom, saying it was "destroying Lebanon's relations with the kingdom of Saudi Arabia."

In April 2021, he heavily criticized Hezbollah, calling them a collaborator of "mini-Nazi" Iran and an enemy to Lebanon.

Ashraf Rifi ran in the 2022 general elections as part of a Lebanese Forces-supported list in the North II district and managed to win one of the Sunni seats in Tripoli.

Awards
The Arab Organization for Administrative Development for the Arab League and the Tatweej Academy for Excellence and Quality awarded Rifi with the title of Man of the Year 2011 in the Arab world for his leadership in security in December 2011.

References

1954 births
Living people
People from Tripoli, Lebanon
Lebanese Sunni Muslims
Lebanese University alumni
Government ministers of Lebanon